Okalice  is a village in the administrative district of Gmina Cewice, within Lębork County, Pomeranian Voivodeship, in northern Poland.

The village has a population of 133.

References

Okalice